"She Thinks That She'll Marry" is a song co-written (with DeWayne Orender) and recorded by American country music artist Judy Rodman. It was released in October 1986 as the fifth single from the album Judy and reached #9 on the Billboard Hot Country Singles & Tracks chart.

Chart performance

References

Songs about marriage
1987 singles
1986 songs
Judy Rodman songs
MTM Records singles
Song recordings produced by Tommy West (producer)
Songs written by Judy Rodman